The 2012–13 season was Manchester City Football Club's 111th season of competitive football, 84th season in the top flight of English football and 16th season in the Premier League. City began the season as defending champions, having won the league in 2011–12. The club also played in the UEFA Champions League for the third time and the second since the competition was rebranded in 1992. However, with little success in the aforementioned competitions, the highlight of the season was City reaching the FA Cup final, the tenth in their history. After beating Chelsea 2–1 at Wembley Stadium on 14 April 2013 in the semi-finals, the Blues played against Wigan Athletic in the final on 11 May 2013. In an anticlimactic match, Manchester City were shut down by relegated Wigan and lost 0–1 due to a late goal. On 13 May 2013, Roberto Mancini was sacked as City manager following three-and-a-half years in the role.

Kits
Supplier: Umbro / Sponsor: Etihad Airways

Kit information
Umbro made their last kits for Manchester City this season.

Home: The home kit featured black trimmings, inspired by Manchester City's first ever home kit when it became known as West Gorton in 1884.

Away: The away kit was officially called "zinfandel", an attractive shade of maroon with golden trimmings.

Third: The third kit was black with shadow stripes and sky blue accents.

Keeper: The three goalkeeper kits were green, purple and yellow.

Non-competitive

Pre-season

Friendlies

China Cup

Post-season

Friendlies

Competitions

Overall

FA Community Shield

Premier League

League table

Results summary

Points breakdown

Points at home: 45 
Points away from home: 33 

Points against 2011–12 Top Four: 10 
Points against promoted teams: 13

6 points: Aston Villa, Fulham, Newcastle United, Reading, West Bromwich Albion, Wigan Athletic
4 points: Arsenal, Queens Park Rangers, Stoke City, Swansea City, West Ham United, Chelsea
3 points: Norwich City, Southampton, Sunderland, Tottenham Hotspur, Manchester United

2 points: Liverpool

1 point: Everton

Biggest & smallest
Biggest home win: 5–0 vs. Aston Villa, 17 November 2012 
Biggest home defeat: 2–3 vs. Norwich City (19 May 2013) and vs Manchester united (9 December 2012)
Biggest away win: 4 by a 2-goal margin 
Biggest away defeat: 3 by a 2-goal margin

Biggest home attendance: 47,386 vs. Everton, 1 December 2012 
Smallest home attendance: 45,579 vs. Queens Park Rangers, 1 September 2012 
Biggest away attendance: 75,498 vs. Manchester United, 8 April 2013 
Smallest away attendance: 19,623 vs. Wigan Athletic, 28 November 2012

Results by round

Matches

FA Cup

Football League Cup

UEFA Champions League

Group stage

Squad information

Player statistics – overall

Appearances include all competitive league and cup appearances, including as substitute.

Playing statistics

Appearances (Apps) numbers are for appearances in competitive games only, including sub appearances.Red card numbers denote: numbers in parentheses represent red cards overturned for wrongful dismissal.

Goalscorers
Includes all competitive matches. The list is sorted by shirt number when total goals are equal.

Last updated on 19 May 2013

Awards

PFA Team of the Year
The combined best 11 from all teams in the Premier League chosen by the PFA.

Premier League Golden Glove award
Awarded to the goalkeeper who kept the most clean sheets over the 2012–13 Premier League season.

Etihad Player of the Year
Based on votes polled by official supporters' clubs and fans online.

Etihad Player of the Month awards
Awarded to the player that receives the most votes in a poll conducted each month on the official website of Manchester City.

Transfers and loans

Transfers in

Transfers out

Loans out

References

2012–13
Manchester City
Manchester City